The Pylons of Pearl River Crossing is a 500 kV power line crossing over the Pearl River in China's Guangdong Province. The power lines are suspended from  towers.

See also

 Yangtze River power line crossings

References

Electric power infrastructure in China